Christopher or Chris Stone may refer to:

Christopher Stone (MP) (1556–1614), English politician
Christopher Stone (actor) (1942–1995), American actor
Christopher Stone (broadcaster) (1882–1965), first disc jockey in the United Kingdom
Christopher Stone (cricketer) (born 1951), former English cricketer
Christopher Stone (criminal justice expert), American criminal justice expert
 Christopher Stone, contestant in series 4 of Britain's Got Talent
Chris Stone (footballer) (born 1959), Australian rules footballer
Chris Stone (entrepreneur), co-founder of the Record Plant recording studios
C.J. Stone (Christopher James Stone, born 1953), author, journalist and freelance writer
Biz Stone (Christopher Isaac Stone, born 1974), American entrepreneur who co-founded Twitter
 Chris Stone, animation director of Dead Space and other games
Chris Stone (sprinter) (born 1995), British sprint athlete and runner-up at the 2019 British Indoor Athletics Championships
 Christopher D. Stone (1937-2021), a legal scholar and proponent of Environmental personhood and Rights of nature